Prairie Township is one of eight townships in Audrain County, Missouri, United States. As of the 2010 census, its population was 932.

History
Prairie Township was established in 1837. The township was named for prairie landscape within its borders.

Geography
It contains three cemeteries: Bean Creek, Eubank and Unity.

The streams of Bean Creek, Hazel Creek, Littleby Creek, Sandy Creek, Talleys Branch, Tattys Creek and Wildcat Creek run through this township.

Transportation
Prairie Township contains one airport or landing strip, Schlemmer Airport.

References

 USGS Geographic Names Information System (GNIS)

External links
 US-Counties.com
 City-Data.com

Townships in Audrain County, Missouri
Townships in Missouri